Agnisakshi ( "The Fire Witness") is an Indian Kannada television drama that premiered on Colors Kannada on 2 December 2013. It came into the foray due some remarkable performances by the lead pair. The show formally came to an end in January 2020, after airing for 6 years. The show received the highest TVR of 19.7 which is still unbeaten by any of the Kannada soap operas

Plot
Two families are associated with Sannidhi, a kind and gentle person who puts the needs of others ahead of hers and Siddharth, a young easy-going, fun-loving businessman. Their marriage was arranged by Siddhartha's elder sister-in-law, Chandrika, who chose Sannidhi because of her infertility and thereby her inability to produce an heir to inherit the family fortune. As time progresses the two fall in love, and Siddharth's younger brother Akhil and Sannidhi's younger sister, Tanu also begin to like each and hope to get married. However, their dreams along with Sannidhi and Siddharth's marriage will be continuously threatened by Chandrika who due to unknown and mysterious reasons (surrounding her father's death, who in turn had a close relation with Vasudev, Siddharth's father) plans to destroy Siddharth's family with the help of her acquaintances. It is also revealed that Chandrika has an elder sister named Radhika who is the real wife of Gautham, the eldest son of Vasudev. The couple have two twin daughters, Kushi and Ayushi. The story revolves around how Sannidhi uses her will power to protect her family by foiling Chandrika's plans.

Cast
 Vaishnavi Gowda as Sannidhi-Siddhartha's wife;a kind and gentle person who vows to protect her family from Chandrika;shyam and Sumathi's daughter; Pradeep and Tanu's sister; Gautham, Akhil and Anjali's sister in law; Vasudeva's daughter in law. 
 Vijay Suriya as Siddhartha- Sannidhi's husband;Vasudeva's 2nd son ;an easy-going and fun-loving guy who is unaware of Chandrika's evil nature but understands in later episodes
 Mukhyamantri Chandru as Vasudeva, Gautham, Siddhartha, Akhil and Anjali's father who is unaware of Chandrika's evil nature and his daughter-in-law Radhika and granddaughters Aayushi and Khushi
 Rajesh Dhruva as Akhil, Vasudeva's 3rd son, Siddhartha and Gautham's younger brother who breaks his marriage with Tanu for the sake of Sannidhi but later marries her because of Chandrika  
 Aishwarya Salimath as Tanu, Sannidhi's younger sister who wanted to marry Akhil but couldn't as Sannidhi was asked to stop their marriageby Maya but she joins hands with Chandrika and marries him but later realizes her mistakes and helps Sannidhi
 Sukrutha Naag as Anjali, Vasudeva's only daughter, Siddhartha, Gautham and Akhil's sister, Shaurya's wife who also learns about Chandrika and accompanies Sannidhi and Maya in unravelling Radhika's mystery but is forced to marry Shaurya by Chandrika 
 Shashank Purushottam as Gautham, Vasudeva's eldest son, real husband of Radhika, father of Aayushi and Khushi who dies saving Aayushi
 Priyanka S. as Chandrika, Radhika's younger sister who avenges her father's death from Vasudeva's family saying she is Gautham's wife, hiding Radhika and Khushi from them and separates Aayushi from Khushi and Radhika
 Anusha Rao as Radhika, the eldest daughter-in-law of Vasudeva's family, Gautham's wife, Aayushi and Khushi's mother, Maya and Chandrika's elder sister who is separated from Aayushi and trusts Chandrika
 Ishitha Varsha as Maya, Chandrika and Radhika's younger sister who was first evil and wanted to marry Akhil and stopped his and Tanu's marriage but after knowing that Chandrika has kept Radhika alive, she joins hands with Sannidhi and Anjali and gives up Akhil
 Sampath J.S. as Pradeep, Sannidhi and Tanu's elder brother 
 Sithara Thaara as Vaani, Pradeep's wife, Sannidhi and Tanu's sister-in-law who is also a helper of Chandrika
 Chitkala Biradar as Sumathi, mother of Sannidhi, Tanu and Pradeep
 R. N. Sudarshan as Swamiji
 Sneha Kappanna as Maid
 Baby Chandana as Aayushi/Radhika/Khushi, who was kidnapped for seven years by Chandrika and kept away from Khushi and Radhika, she later is taken care by Vasudeva's family and Khushi, a happy-go-lucky girl who lives with Radhika, Gautham's twin daughters. Both also get swapped once but later reunite with their families
 Amith Rao as Kishore, Chandrika's boyfriend
 Nagarjun as Kaushik/Tejas, Kishore's younger brother who helps Chandrika to avenge Kishore's death by torturing Anjali by tricking her into marrying him but is later arrested
 Rajeshwari Parthasarathy as Chandrika
 Shobha Shetty as Tanu

Guest appearances
 Kavitha as Chinnu, Siddharth's love interest from Lakshmi Baramma serial
 Yasir as Adithya Local Gangster 
 Karthik Jayaram as JK, Sannidhi's brother (initial episodes and Siddharth's court episode)
 Skanda Ashok  as Raman, Siddharth's friend (in Kishore's kidnapping episode)

Crossover
Agnisakshi actors have appeared together in several other shows. In Lakshmi Baramma, Chinnu is Siddarth's initial love interest and Chinnu appears in the first few episodes of the Agnisakshi and the entire cast of Lakshmi Baramma attends Sannidhi and Siddharth's wedding. In the serial Ashwini Nakshatra, Sannidhi portrays the role of JK's sister and finally, the serial Radha Ramana's lead Ramana has a friend which is portrayed by Siddharth of Agnisakshi. In October 2020, almost after eight months after ending the serial the cast joined the serial Nannarasi Radhe for a crossover episode.

Adaptations

References 

2013 Indian television series debuts
Kannada-language television shows
Colors Kannada original programming
2020 Indian television series endings